Dithioles are a type of sulfur-containing heterocycle.  The parent members have the formula C3H4S2. Dithioles exist in two isomers:
 1,2-Dithiole
 1,3-Dithiole